Minuscule 126 (in the Gregory-Aland numbering), ε 185 (Von Soden numbering). It is a Greek minuscule manuscript of the New Testament, written on parchment. Palaeographically it has been assigned to the 12th century. It has complex contents with full marginalia.

Description 

The manuscript contains a complete text of the four Gospels on 219 parchment leaves. The text is written in one column per page, 26 lines per page. Matthew 28:18-20 is written in cruciform. The capital letters are often occur in the middle of words. According to F. H. A. Scrivener the manuscript was carelessly written.

There is also a division according to the smaller Ammonian Sections (in Mark 241 - 16:20), with references to the Eusebian Canons (written below Ammonian Section numbers).

Text 

The Greek text of the codex is a representative of the Byzantine text-type. Hermann von Soden classified it to the textual family Kx. Aland placed it in Category V.

According to the Claremont Profile Method it represents textual family Kx in Luke 1, Luke 10, and Luke 20.

The text is of an unusual character.

History 

The manuscript was examined by Heusinger (1752), Birch, Franz Anton Knittel, and Tischendorf. C. R. Gregory saw it in 1891.

Currently the codex is located at the Herzog August Bibliothek (Theol. Gr. 60) at Wolfenbüttel.

See also 
 List of New Testament minuscules
 Biblical manuscript

References

Further reading 

 

Greek New Testament minuscules
12th-century biblical manuscripts
Herzog August Library